The Nokia 701 is a smartphone from Nokia released in Q4 2011. It shipped with the "Belle" version of Symbian^3. It has a 3.5" IPS-LCD display with 640 x 360 pixels. The brightness of the display is 1000 nits (which Nokia called the brightest display in the world) and uses Gorilla Glass. Nokia announced the phone on 24 August 2011. Its design is very much based on that of the Nokia C7. A Nokia Belle update (Feature Pack 1) increased the processor speed of the 701 from 1.0 GHz to 1.3 GHz.

Applications 

Additional Apps are available in the Ovi Store from Nokia. The Nokia 701 has several preloaded Apps: Phone switch, Quickoffice, Music Player, Social client for social network feeds, Nokia Maps, Nokia Browser, Nokia Music, Ovi Store, Vlingo, Microsoft Communicator Mobile, Shazam, Adobe PDF reader, WebTV widgets, Angry Birds Magic with NFC (free edition), and Asphalt 5 with NFC.

References 

Nokia smartphones
Symbian devices
Mobile phones introduced in 2011
Mobile phones with user-replaceable battery